Enquin-sur-Baillons is a commune in the Pas-de-Calais department in the Hauts-de-France region of France.

Geography
A village situated some 8 miles (12 km) northeast of Montreuil-sur-Mer at the D148 road.

Population

Places of interest
 The fifteenth century church of Saint Sylvestre

See also
Communes of the Pas-de-Calais department

References

Enquinsurbaillons